Yared Asmerom Tesfit (born 4 February 1980 in Asmara) is an Eritrean long-distance runner who specializes in the marathon races. He was born in Asmara.

Biography
In 2005 he finished ninth at the World Half Marathon Championships and 25th at the World Championships. In 2006 he competed at the World Road Running Championships but did not finish the race. He finished fourth in the marathon at the 2007 World Championships. He also ran in the half marathon at the 2007 All-Africa Games that year, but finished in fifteenth place.

He made his Olympic debut at the 2008 Beijing Games and was his country's best performer in the marathon, finishing in eighth place. He made further appearances in Eritrea's World Championships marathon squad, but failed to finish the distance in both 2009 and 2011.

On the road running circuit, he set a personal best time of 2:08:34 hours at the Lake Biwa Marathon and finished as runner-up. He returned to that event the following year and again reached the podium, coming third in a time of 2:10:49 hours. He improved his personal best to 2:07:27 hours at the Chuncheon International Marathon, where he was second behind Stanley Biwott.

Achievements

Personal bests
Half marathon - 1:00:28 hrs (2007)
Marathon - 2:07:27 hrs (2011)

References

External links

1980 births
Living people
Sportspeople from Asmara
Eritrean male long-distance runners
Eritrean male marathon runners
Athletes (track and field) at the 2008 Summer Olympics
Athletes (track and field) at the 2012 Summer Olympics
Olympic athletes of Eritrea
Athletes (track and field) at the 2007 All-Africa Games
African Games competitors for Eritrea
21st-century Eritrean people